Siberia is the region of Russia and northern Kazakhstan between the Ural Mountains and the Pacific Ocean.

Siberia may also refer to:

Geography
Siberia (continent), the craton located in the heart of the region of Siberia
Siberian Federal District, a federal district of Russia
Siberia, California, a disappeared town in the Mojave Desert, California
Siberia, Indiana, a community in the United States
Waverley, Western Australia or Siberia, an abandoned town in the goldfields
1094 Siberia, an asteroid
La Brévine, known as the Siberia of Switzerland

Film and TV
Siberia (1926 film), a lost 1926 silent film
Siberia (1998 film), a 1998 Dutch comedy film
Siberia (2018 film), a 2018 romantic crime thriller
Siberia (2020 film), a 2020 Italian film
Siberia (TV series), a 2013 American TV series

Music
Siberia (opera), a 1903 opera by Umberto Giordano
Siberia (Lights album), 2011
Siberia (Echo & the Bunnymen album), 2005
Siberia (Polvo album), 2013
"Siberia", from the 1955 musical Silk Stockings
"Siberia", a song by the Backstreet Boys from Edna (album)
"Siberia", a song by Headie One from Never Gone
"Siberian Khatru" or "Siberia", a 1972 song by Yes

See also
Syberia (disambiguation)
Sibiria, a Swedish indie pop band
Cyberia (disambiguation)
Siberian (disambiguation)
Sibirsky (disambiguation)